Bryan-Brown is a surname and may be:

 Adrian Bryan-Brown, American theatrical press agent
 Marc Bryan-Brown, American photographer

See also 
 Boneau/Bryan-Brown, an American theatrical press agency
 Bryan Brown, Australia actor
 Bryan D. Brown, American general

Compound surnames